Lynn Aldrich (born 1944) is an American sculptor whose diverse works draw on a wide range of high and low cultural influences and materials. Her work can range from what art writers describe as "slyly Minimalist meditations" on color, light and space to whimsical "Home Depot Pop" that reveals and critiques the excesses—visual, formal and material—of unbridled consumption. Critics Leah Ollman and Claudine Ise of the Los Angeles Times have described Aldrich's art, respectively, as a "consumerist spin on the assemblage tradition" and a "witty and inventive brand of kitchen-sink Conceptualism" LA Weekly critic Doug Harvey calls her "one of the most under-recognized sculptors in L.A.," whose hallmarks are the poetic transformation of found/appropriated materials, formal inventiveness and restless eclecticism. Aldrich has exhibited at the Museum of Contemporary Art, Los Angeles (MOCA), Los Angeles County Museum of Art (LACMA), Hammer Museum, Santa Monica Museum of Art, and venues throughout the United States and Europe. She has been recognized with a Guggenheim Fellowship (2014) and public art collection acquisitions by LACMA, MOCA Los Angeles and the Portland Art Museum, among others.

Early life and career 
Aldrich was born in Bryan, Texas into a military family that periodically moved throughout the United States. Her father was a veterinary pathologist at the Armed Forces Institute of Pathology and National Zoo (Washington, DC) and science was an influence on her early thought and interests and later art practice. She initially studied biology at Stetson University, working as a virology lab assistant at Smith, Kline & French Laboratories (Philadelphia) during college summers. After shifting to English Literature, she graduated from University of North Carolina, Chapel Hill (BA, 1966), where she met future husband, Michael Aldrich. After deciding to move west, they settled in Glendale, California in 1970, where they raised three sons, Jack, Matthew, and Daniel.

Always interested in visual art, Aldrich took painting and drawing classes at Glendale Community College, before studying art at California State University, Northridge (BA, 1984) with painter Marvin Harden and at Art Center College of Design (MFA, 1986) with artists Jeremy Gilbert-Rolfe and Stephen Prina. In graduate school she conceived a working strategy that emphasized materials, poetic allusions, three-dimensionality, shifts in scale and reductive simplicity rather than a signature style; her influences included theorist Paul Virilio, artist/writer Robert Smithson, minimalists Donald Judd and Anne Truitt, and Californians Robert Irwin and Ed Ruscha. Aldrich exhibited widely in her first decade, gaining notice for solo shows at Krygier/Landau, Sue Spaid Fine Art, and Sandroni Rey (California), the Santa Monica Museum of Art, Cristinerose Gallery (New York) and Art Affairs Gallery (Amsterdam), as well as group shows at venues including MOCA Los Angeles, Los Angeles Municipal Art Gallery, San Francisco Art Institute, P.P.O.W. (New York), and Portland Institute of Contemporary Art.

In Aldrich's later career, Carl Berg Gallery, Ben Maltz Gallery, Edward Cella Art+Architecture, DENK Gallery (all Los Angeles) and Jenkins Johnson Gallery (New York), among others, have held solo exhibitions of her work; her group exhibitions include shows at LACMA, MOCA Pacific Design Center, the Hammer Museum, San Jose Museum of Art, Paula Cooper Gallery and Museum of Biblical Art (both New York). Aldrich has also taught art at Azusa Pacific University (2011–5), Mars Hill Graduate School (2002–7), Art Center College of Design (1987–1998), UCLA, Otis College of Art and Design, and Biola University. She lives and works in the Los Angeles area.

Work and reception 
Aldrich incorporates a wide range of reference points in her work: the excess and spectacle of consumer culture and life in Los Angeles, art and literary influences, natural and celestial phenomena, and Christian longing for revelation and transcendence. Curator Stephen Nowlin wrote that Aldrich's "heterogeneous works fuse and defuse Duchamp, pop, and minimalist influences, at once both respectfully and irreverently, measuring the dimensions of contemporary existence by their use of a consumer's palette." Critics often note various, resulting dualities in her work: banality and profundity, humorous spectacle and near-apocalyptic concern, scientific empiricism and faith.

Writers also emphasize Aldrich's playing of artistic influences (including the Light and Space movement) off of feminist strategies that inject everyday and domestic objects and notions into fine art. She creates through processes of accumulation, repetition and placement that preserve the fundamental, recognizable nature of her source materials; the resulting works (and their punning titles) fuse, deconstruct or short-circuit form, function and meaning, creating physical and conceptual conundrums that reveal inherent metaphors and poetic essences in common objects.

Early work (1987–1996) 
Early reviews describe Aldrich's work as "tartly conceptual," "stunningly formalist arrangements" that transform mundane artifacts into inventive visual metaphors. Meshing high-cultural minimalist form with the symbolism of mass-produced objects, works such as Subdivision (1990) or Shelf Life (1992) offered open-ended commentary on suburban domesticity, bourgeois humanism, and Modernist artistic practice. Subdivision featured sections of white picket fence arranged in a tight square formation that reviewers wrote signified both idealized suburban life and the claustrophobia or menace of pristine but squeezed living; Shelf Life featured stacks of food cans stripped of labels and wedged into a cupboard–like space, a meditation on obsolescence and mortality that Artforum likened visually to "a miniature Louise Nevelson in metal."

Critics suggested that in Aldrich's best work, the merger of materials and concept seemed effortless; David Pagel described Waxing and Waning (1990)—two dozen strips of wax paper hanging between plastic dispensers on adjoining walls—as a graceful, "ghostly send-up of Robert Morris’s seminal felt pieces" alluding to the invisibility and power of domestic labor. The nested, resin-starched t-shirts of Shell Collection (1993–4) referenced the life cycle and natural forms such as tree rings, organic sheddings, or chrysalises; ARTnews's Suzanne Muchnic described such works as "unusual think pieces" whose light touch, wry humor, and ephemerality made their "ideas all the more memorable because they seem weightless."

Mature work (1997– ) 
Reviews of Aldrich's major mid-career shows (1997–2008) suggest that she embraced a more assertive theatricality and sensual extravagance, mining consumer society's inadvertent beauty and revealing its perils. More whimsical, busier in its color, spatial and textural range, this work pushed further against minimalist restrictions concerning narrative and referential content, connecting more strongly to bodily and connotative associations and yielding more overtly philosophical and theological themes involving the earth and cosmos, society, and perception.
	
In Designer's Choice (Genesis) (1997; a floor grid of 125 faux-fur upholstery fabric swatches) and Worm Hole (2003; a tunnel of concrete casting tubes lined with a spectrum of faux-fur), Aldrich mixed low-end, near-garish consumer products, minimalist form and spiritual, scientific and metaphysical allusions. For Breaker (1999), Serpentarium (2002) and Drench (2008), she re-contextualized common garden hoses, using their aqua-to-green hues like pigments and conjuring allusions to water, poised snakes in paradise, suburban backyards, and abstract stripe paintings, among others; Breaker suggested a large, playfully menacing wave that rose from the floor like a Hokusai etching, its gleaming brass fittings resembling flecks of foam.

Several tragicomic works mimicked aquatic life with commercial products (often from the petroleum economy that threatens oceanic life), offering ironic, furtive critiques of consumer society. Sea Change (2003) is a Day-Glo diorama of undersea life constructed out of kitchen sponges and scrub pads; Starting Over: Neo-Atlantis uses cleaning products and toilet plungers to create a hyperbolic, synthetic undersea world whose riot of color rivals nature's chromatic range. Leah Ollman described such work as packing "a cartoon-like pow [that] resonate[s] powerfully—and whimsically—with both natural and unnatural worlds, the domestic sphere and global trauma."

In the later-2000s, Aldrich explored metaphors involving water, thirst and longing in works using galvanized steel rain gutters whose meaning (and titles) balanced between formal object, suburban vernacular and metaphor. Silver Lining (2009) is a large array of shiny metal downspouts suspended at varying heights from above, their open insides painted shades of blue suggesting rain streaks, organ pipes, and the sacramental. In Desert Springs (2006–9) and Bouquet (2009), Aldrich upended the function of downspouts, arranging them like springs, cacti, animal eyestalks or bursting flowers. Hydra Hydrant (2010) features a trunk of white downspouts extending up in a twisting, lyrical multi-headed frenzy.

Writers suggest that Aldrich's work often brings the transcendent or majestic into intimate, common domestic space, as in My Niagara (2012) or Ray (2005/2013), a restrained, ceiling-to-floor, sunbeam-like sculpture of 150 unique colors of sewing threads suggesting illumination or epiphany. Her "Lampshade" wallworks (The Violet Hour (for T.S. Eliot); Constellation) likewise transform the mundane—cheap, partially filled lampshades affixed top-side to walls with subtly painted interiors—into celestial bowls of color and light that Susan Kandel said suggest "that revelation is available even, or maybe especially, at the 99-cent store." The installation Rosy Future (2015) re-imagined the awe and light of stained glass cathedral interiors, using drywall, tar paper and paint; Hermitage (2019), a fourteen-foot telescope-shaped column that viewers can enter, uses simple materials and low-tech construction to recreate the meditative, high-tech light effects of James Turrell's skyspaces.

Public recognition 
Aldrich has been recognized with fellowships from the John S. Guggenheim Foundation (2014), J. Paul Getty Trust (2000), and City of Los Angeles (COLA, 1999). She has also received a Communication Arts Design Award for Un/Common Objects: Lynn Aldrich (2014), a United States Artists Project Award (2014), a Christians in the Visual Arts (CIVA) Award (2007), and a Florence Biennale prize for sculpture (2001), among others.

Aldrich's work belongs to the public collections of LACMA, MOCA Los Angeles, New York Public Library, Portland Art Museum, Ahmanson Art Gallery (Irvine, CA), Calder Foundation, Cornell Fine Arts Museum (Winter Park, FL), and Westmont Ridley-Tree Museum of Art (Santa Barbara, CA), as well as many private collections. She has also received public art commissions from the Los Angeles Metro Transit Authority (for Blue Line Oasis, 1994, Artesia Blue Line station) and the Armory Center for the Arts (for the temporary public installation, Three Founts, 2010).

References

External links 
 Lynn Aldrich official website
 Lynn Aldrich: Uncommon Artist, documentary

21st-century American sculptors
20th-century American sculptors
American women sculptors
Artists from Los Angeles
Art Center College of Design alumni
California State University, Northridge alumni
American art educators
1944 births
Living people
20th-century American women artists
21st-century American women artists